Joseph Clay Stiles Blackburn (October 1, 1838September 12, 1918) was a Democratic Representative and Senator from Kentucky.  Blackburn, a skilled and spirited orator, was also a prominent trial lawyer known for his skill at swaying juries.

Biography

Blackburn was born on October 1, 1838 near Spring Station, Kentucky. He was the younger brother of Kentucky governor Luke P. Blackburn.

He attended Sayres Institute in Frankfort and graduated from Centre College in Danville in 1857. He studied law in Lexington and was admitted to the bar in 1858. He practiced in Chicago until 1860 when he returned to Woodford County, Kentucky and entered the Confederate Army as a private in 1861.

A staff officer, by the end of the Civil War Blackburn had attained the rank of lieutenant colonel. After the war he settled in Arkansas  where he was engaged as a lawyer and a planter in Desha County until 1868 when he returned to Kentucky and opened law offices in Versailles.

He was a member of the State house of representatives from 1871 to 1875. He was then elected as a Democrat to the Forty-fourth and to the four succeeding Congresses (March 4, 1875 - March 3, 1885). He was the chairman of the Committee on the District of Columbia (Forty-fifth Congress) and the Committee on Expenditures in the Department of War (Forty-fifth and Forty-sixth Congresses).

In 1885, Lt. Henry T. Allen of the U.S. army named a mountain after Joseph Blackburn. Mount Blackburn is the highest peak in the Wrangell Mountains of the state of Alaska and the fifth highest peak in the United States.

He was elected to the United States Senate in 1884, was reelected in 1890, and served from March 4, 1885, to March 3, 1897. He failed to be reelected in 1896. He was the chairman of the Committee on Rules (Fifty-third Congress).  He was once again elected to the United States Senate in 1900 and served from March 4, 1901 to March 3, 1907, but failed in his next election bid in 1906. Loosely associated with the free-silver wing of the Democratic party, he was well-known nationally and his name was placed in nomination for the presidency in 1896.

He was appointed Governor of the Panama Canal Zone by President Theodore Roosevelt on April 1, 1907. He resigned and returned to his estate in Woodford County.

He died on September 12, 1918 in Washington, D.C. He was interred in the State Cemetery in Frankfort.

References

Further reading

External links

|-

|-

|-

|-

|-

|-

|-

1838 births
1918 deaths
Arkansas lawyers
Illinois lawyers
Kentucky lawyers
Centre College alumni
American planters
Democratic Party United States senators from Kentucky
Democratic Party members of the United States House of Representatives from Kentucky
People from Woodford County, Kentucky
19th-century American politicians
People of Kentucky in the American Civil War
Confederate States Army officers
Farmers from Illinois
Farmers from Arkansas
19th-century American lawyers